John J. McDonough is an American politician who served as a member of the Boston School Committee from 1966 to 1968 and again from 1972 to 1982. He was the Chairman/President of the School Committee in 1967, 1975, 1976, and 1980. He was an unsuccessful candidate for Mayor of Boston in 1967.

McDonough was an opponent of court-ordered busing and in 1974 he and two other School Committee members were held in contempt of court for not coming up with a second phase of the desegregation process.

In 1981, McDonough was acquitted on charges of taking a $5,000 kickback from a school bus company.

He is the brother of former Boston City Councilor and city clerk Patrick F. McDonough.

References

Boston School Committee members
Politicians from Quincy, Massachusetts
Living people
Year of birth missing (living people)
Place of birth missing (living people)